Hans Wilhelm Eduard Schwerdtfeger  (9 December 1902 – 26 June 1990) was a German-Canadian-Australian mathematician who worked in Galois theory, matrix theory, theory of groups and their geometries, and complex analysis.  

"In 1962 he published Geometry of Complex Numbers: Circle Geometry, Möbius Transformations, Non-Euclidean Geometry which: 
... should be in every library, and every expert in classical function theory should be familiar with this material. The author has performed a distinct service by making this material so conveniently accessible in a single book. " -

See also
EP matrix

References

1902 births
1990 deaths
University of Bonn alumni
Academic staff of the University of Melbourne
Academic staff of McGill University
Academic staff of the University of Adelaide
20th-century German mathematicians
20th-century  Canadian mathematicians
20th-century Australian mathematicians